Saknoiya is an Assamese language film directed by Soilya Boruah. The film was released in 1959 in the early days of Assamese cinema.

Plot
The story revolves round the emotions of two brothers, one a taxi driver and the other a high official in a government office. Trouble breaks when the brother with high social status marries a lady who would not agree to reside together with a taxi driver.

Production
The indoor shooting was done in Indrapuri Studio, Kolkata. The editing of this film was also done in Kolkata.

Casts
Gyanada Kakoti
Bina Baruba
Tulsi Das
Sorbeswar Chakravarty
Bina Das
Soilyo Baruah
Anil Das
Durgeswar Barthakur
Saityen Choudhury

See also
 Jollywood

References

1959 films
1959 romantic drama films
Films set in Assam
1950s Assamese-language films
Indian romantic drama films